Nawel Chiali (born 28 June 1991) is an Algerian rower.

She competed in the 2018 World Rowing Championships held in Plovdiv, Bulgaria.

She competed in rowing at the 2019 African Games held in Rabat, Morocco. She won the gold medal in the women's single sculls 500 metres event. She also won the gold medal in the women's single sculls 1000 metres event.

References 

1991 births
Living people
Algerian female rowers
African Games gold medalists for Algeria
African Games medalists in rowing
Competitors at the 2019 African Games
21st-century Algerian women
20th-century Algerian women